The Commissioner of the New South Wales Police Force (known from 1851 to 1926 as the Inspector-General of the New South Wales Police Force) is the head of New South Wales Police Force. The post is currently held by Karen Webb, who replaced Mick Fuller on 1 February 2022. The rank is usually referred to as the New South Wales Police Commissioner or simply just "Commissioner". The New South Wales Police Force has had 23 Commissioners since 1851.

History
The role was established under the Act for the Regulation of the Police Force in New South Wales 1850 (known as the 'Colonial Police Act 1850'), which provided for the appointment by the Governor of New South Wales of an Inspector-General of Police. This act was repealed with the passage of the Police Regulation Act of 1862, which amalgamated the various police forces in the colony into one force responsible to the Inspector-General in Sydney. 

The first Inspector-General of Police was appointed on 1 January 1851. The title was changed to be "Commissioner" on 8 January 1926, although the official title would legally remain as "Inspector-General" until the passage of the Police Regulation (Amendment) Act 1935.

List of inspectors-general and commissioners

References

External links
 Commissioner – NSW Police Online

Lists of Australian public servants
 
Lists of office-holders in Australia
New South Wales-related lists
Lists of people from New South Wales